The Ministry of Interior (abbreviated as MoI) is a Cabinet-level ministry of the Government of Pakistan, tasked and primarily responsible for implementing the internal policies, state security, administration of internal affairs involving the state and assisting the government on territorial affairs of Federally Administered Tribal Areas (Fata), and insular areas of Provincially Administered Tribal Areas (PATA).

The ministry is led by the Interior Minister, the Minister of State for Interior and the Interior Secretary. The Interior Secretary is a Grade 22 officer whereas the Interior Minister is a leading member of the federal cabinet. The ministry is located in Islamabad and is currently led by Rana Sanaullah Khan.

The minister is required to be a member of parliament. During the martial regimes of Generals Ayub Khan and Yahya Khan, from 1962 until 1971, the Interior Minister was called Home Affairs Minister.

Organisation
Minister of Interior
Minister of State for Interior
Secretary of Interior
Additional Secretary I
Joint Secretary Administration
Joint Secretary Political
Additional Secretary II
Joint Secretary Information & Communication Technology
Joint Secretary Civil Armed Forces
Additional Secretary III
Joint Secretary Immigration & Nationality
Joint Secretary Legal Affairs

Agencies

Anti-Narcotics Force

The Anti-Narcotics Force (ANF) is a federal executive bureau under ministry, tasked with combating the drug smuggling and use within Pakistan.

Directorate General of Civil Defence 

The Directorate General of Civil Defence provides civil defence and emergency services.

Immigration & Passports 

Deal with all the issues of Pakistani citizenship, passports and visas.

Federal Investigation Agency 

Federal Investigation Agency

National Academy for Prisons Administration 

Federal Government's training institute for prison staff of all four provinces of Pakistan.

National Aliens Registration Authority

National Counter Terrorism Authority 

Internal Counterterrorism Authority of Pakistan

National Crises Management Cell 

NCMC is a primary domestic intelligence assessment and management institution.

National Database and Registration Authority (NADRA) 

NADRA regulates government databases and statistically manages the sensitive registration database of all the national citizens of Pakistan

National Police Academy of Pakistan 

National Police Academy of Pakistan is a federal training centre for the senior officers of the civilian law enforcement agencies of Pakistan.

National Police Bureau

Exit Control List

Pakistan Coast Guards 

Pakistan Rangers

Pakistan Rangers, Sindh

Frontier Corps, Balochistan

Frontier Constabulary

Frontier Corps, KPK

Gilgit Baltistan Scouts

List of Interior Ministers of Pakistan

See also
Constitution of Pakistan
President of Pakistan
Prime Minister of Pakistan
Defence Minister of Pakistan
Foreign Minister of Pakistan
Finance Minister of Pakistan
Police Service of Pakistan
Civil Defense of Pakistan

References

External links
 Ministry of the Interior
 About the Ministry of Interior
 Parliamentary Cabinet of Pakistan

Interior
Pakistan